Lambeth is a London borough in South London, England, which forms part of Inner London. Its name was recorded in 1062 as Lambehitha ("landing place for lambs") and in 1255 as Lambeth. The geographical centre of London is at Frazier Street near Lambeth North tube station, though nearby Charing Cross on the other side of the Thames in the City of Westminster is traditionally considered the centre of London.

History

Origins

Lambeth was part of the large ancient parish of Lambeth St Mary, the site of the archepiscopal Lambeth Palace, in the hundred of Brixton in the county of Surrey. Lambeth became part of the Metropolitan Police District in 1829. It remained a parish for Poor Law purposes after the Poor Law Amendment Act 1834, and was governed by a vestry after the introduction of the Metropolitan Board of Works in 1855.

Borough origins
Until 1889, Surrey included the present-day London borough of Lambeth. When the government drew the boundaries for the present London boroughs, it initially suggested that the Metropolitan Borough of Lambeth and the Metropolitan Borough of Southwark be merged into a new borough; the southern and eastern sections of the Metropolitan Borough of Wandsworth (including Clapham, Streatham and Tooting) would form another. South Shields town clerk R.S. Young was commissioned to make final recommendations to the government on the shape of the future London boroughs, and he noted that the Wandsworth council opposed the partition of its borough. However, Wandsworth's suggestion to merge Lambeth with the Metropolitan Borough of Battersea was rejected by both councils involved. Young believed that residents of Clapham and Streatham would be more familiar with Brixton than with Wandsworth, and recommended a new borough formed from the Metropolitan Borough of Lambeth and six wards and portions of two others from the Metropolitan Borough of Wandsworth.

Political events
In 1979, the administration of Edward ("Red Ted") Knight organised the borough's first public demonstration against the Thatcher government. In 1985 Knight's Labour administration was subjected to rate-capping, with its budget restricted by the government. Knight and most of the Labour councillors protested by refusing to propose budgets. As a result of the protest, 32 councillors were ordered to repay interest lost by the council due to budgeting delays and were disqualified from office for five years.

In 1991, Joan Twelves' administration failed to collect the poll tax and opposed the war in the Persian Gulf. The following year, Twelves and 12 other councillors were suspended from the local Labour Party by regional officials for advocating non-payment of the poll tax and other ideas. Twelves' deputy leader at this time was John Harrison.
 
From 1978 to 2002 the council comprised 64 members, elected from 20 three-member and two two-member wards. Before this, the council had 60 members elected from 20 three-member wards. Just before the 2010 election, its political balance was 37 Labour members, 18 Liberal Democrats, seven Conservatives and one Green, giving Labour an eleven-member majority. In the 2010 Lambeth Council election, Labour gained seats and the Liberal Democrats, Conservatives and Greens lost seats. In 2014 the Liberal Democrats lost their seats, Conservatives were reduced to three and the Greens to one. Labour, gaining seats from the Conservatives and Liberal Democrats, had 59 seats.

In the 2016 European Union referendum, Lambeth had the highest share of Remain votes in the United Kingdom at 78.62%, second to overseas territory Gibraltar's 95.9%.

Geography
Brixton is its civic centre, and there are other town centres. The largest shopping areas are (in order of size) Streatham, Brixton, Vauxhall, Clapham and West Norwood.

In the northern part of the borough are the central London districts of the South Bank, Vauxhall and Lambeth; in the south are the suburbs of Gipsy Hill, Streatham, West Dulwich and West Norwood. In between are the developed and inner-city districts of Brixton, Brixton Hill, Streatham Hill, Clapham, Clapham Park, Herne Hill, Stockwell, Tulse Hill and Kennington, each at different stages of gentrification with suburban and urban elements. Vauxhall and South Lambeth are central districts in the process of redevelopment with high-density business and residential property. Streatham lies between suburban London and inner-city Brixton, with the suburban and developed areas of Streatham, Streatham Hill and Streatham Vale.

The London Borough of Southwark lies to the east of the Borough of Lambeth.  To the west is the London Borough of Wandsworth; to the south-west is the London Borough of Merton; and to the south is the London Borough of Croydon.

Parks and green space

Lambeth's open spaces include Brockwell Park and Lido, Streatham Common, half of Clapham Common, West Norwood Cemetery, Archbishop's Park, Norbury Park, Vauxhall Pleasure Gardens and Ruskin Larkhall and Kennington Parks.

Landmarks
Along and around the South Bank, a tourist area has developed around the former Greater London Council headquarters of County Hall and the Southbank Centre and National Theatre. Also on the river is the London Eye and Shell Centre. Nearby is St Thomas' Hospital, Lambeth Palace and the Florence Nightingale Museum. Nearby is Brixton, home of Lambeth Town Hall and the Brixton Murals.

Landmark church buildings include:
 St Mary's, Lambeth (now the Garden Museum)
 The four "Waterloo Churches" in the former Lambeth Parish:
 St Matthew's, Brixton 
 St Mark's, Kennington
 St Luke's, West Norwood
 St John's, Waterloo
 Holy Trinity, Clapham
 St Leonard's, Streatham
 Christ Church, Streatham Hill
 Christ Church (Church of England), Brixton Road, North Brixton
 All Saints' Church, West Dulwich (Church of England)
 Holy Trinity, Trinity Rise, Tulse Hill
 St John the Divine (Church of England), Vassall Road

The Oval cricket ground in Kennington is the home of Surrey County Cricket.

The Basaveshwara statue at the Albert Embankment erected by the former Mayor of Lambeth Neeraj Patil was unveiled by the Prime Minister of India on 14 November 2015.

Demography

Ethnicity

Language

Religion

Sexuality
Lambeth is the local authority with the highest relative gay or lesbian population in the UK, at 5.5%, with the borough containing the gay village of Vauxhall and the area around Clapham Common.

Arts
 South London Theatre, a community theatre in West Norwood
 National Theatre
 Southbank Centre
 Old Vic Theatre
 Young Vic Theatre
 Ballet Rambert
 British Film Institute
 Black Cultural Archives
 Beconsfield 
 Gasworks Gallery 
 Newport Street Gallery 
 Ovalhouse theatre
 Cinema Museum

Civic affairs

Borough Council

Since 2002, Lambeth Borough Council has had 63 members elected in 21 three-member wards by means of a plurality bloc voting system. The wards are Bishop's, Brixton Hill, Clapham Common, Clapham Town, Coldharbour, Ferndale, Gipsy Hill, Herne Hill, Knight's Hill, Larkhall, Oval, Prince's, St Leonard's, Stockwell, Streatham Hill, Streatham South, Streatham Wells, Thornton, Thurlow Park, Tulse Hill and Vassall.

The independent Local Government Boundary Commission for England reviewed Lambeth’s electoral arrangements. The Commission’s recommendations have now passed into law and take effect on Thursday 5 May 2022, when council elections take place across the borough. Most wards will have a new name, 12 wards will be represented by 2 councillors, 13 wards will be represented by 3 councillors and Lambeth’s total number of councillors stays the same at 63.

Civic council affairs
The council is run by a leader and cabinet, chaired by council leader Claire Holland. All cabinet members are from the ruling Labour Party who hold 55 of the 63 seats on Lambeth Council.

The Leader of the official Opposition is Jonathan Bartley (Green) and the leader of the Conservative group is Tim Briggs.

From 1994 to 2014, the Mayor of Lambeth was elected unanimously by their fellow councillors, with each of the three political parties supplying a candidate in rotation. According to the borough's website, this underscored the mayor's apolitical role and enables him or her to represent all the borough's citizens.
Since 2014, the predominance of the Labour Party has meant that all subsequent Mayors have been members of the Labour group.

Coat of arms
The borough's coat of arms is that of the former Metropolitan Borough of Lambeth, with two gold stars (mullets) in the second and third quarters of the shield indicating the addition of the districts of Clapham and Streatham. Its motto is "Spectemur agendo" ("Let us be judged according to our conduct").

Westminster Parliament
The borough has three Parliamentary constituencies: Dulwich and West Norwood (shared with Southwark), Streatham, and Vauxhall.

Twinning
The former Metropolitan Borough of Lambeth and its successor have been twinned with the Vincennes district of Paris in France since 1955. Lambeth is also twinned with Bluefields, Nicaragua; Brooklyn, New York; and Spanish Town, Jamaica.

Transport
The borough covers London Waterloo railway station, the Waterloo tube station network and (until 2007) the London terminus for Eurostar.
National Rail service in Lambeth is provided by South Western Railway, Southeastern, Southern, Thameslink and London Overground.

Bridges and tunnels

Waterloo Bridge, incorporating the National Film Theatre
Hungerford Bridge and Golden Jubilee Bridges
Lambeth Bridge
Westminster Bridge
Vauxhall Bridge

Railway stations
Brixton
Gipsy Hill
Herne Hill
Loughborough Junction
Streatham
Streatham Common
Streatham Hill
Tulse Hill
Vauxhall
Waterloo
Waterloo East
West Norwood

London Overground stations
Clapham High Street
Wandsworth Road

Tube stations
Brixton
Clapham Common
Clapham North
Lambeth North
Nine Elms
Oval
Stockwell
Vauxhall
Waterloo

Commuting
In March 2011, the primary forms of transport borough residents used to travel to work were the London Underground, metro, light rail or tram (21.4 percent of residents aged 16–74); bus, minibus or coach (10 percent); train (10 percent); automobile (8.6 percent); bicycle (5.7 percent), or walking (5.4 percent). A small percentage (3.2 percent) worked mainly at—or from—home.

See also
 Lambeth London Borough Council
 List of districts in Lambeth
 List of schools in Lambeth

References

External links

 Lambeth.gov.uk London Borough of Lambeth Official Website
 electionmemory.com Independent Lambeth Council Elections Forum
 General information on Lambeth parks and green spaces
 Community Police Consultative Group for Lambeth Independent forum for community and statutory agencies to address community safety and policing issues.

 
1965 establishments in the United Kingdom
Local authorities adjoining the River Thames
London boroughs